Oskar Tork (6 June 1895, Ahja Parish (now Põlva Parish), Kreis Dorpat – 24 March 1930, Tartu) was an Estonian politician. He was a member of the IV Riigikogu. After his death, he was replaced by Karl Kanep.

References

1895 births
1930 deaths
People from Põlva Parish
People from Kreis Dorpat
Estonian Workers' Party politicians
Members of the Riigikogu, 1929–1932